Edgar Anton Häring (11 May 1894 – 25 July 1971) was a German Catholic priest and bishop of the Roman Catholic Diocese of Shuozhou from 1927 to 1971.

Biography
Edgar Anton Häring was born in Frittlingen, Baden-Württemberg, German Empire, on 11 May 1894. He became a member of the Franciscans in 1913. He was ordained a priest on 19 September 1920. That same year, he was sent as a missionary to China. On 15 July 1927, he was appointed bishop of the Roman Catholic Diocese of Shuozhou by the Holy See.

After establishment of the Communist State in 1949, Edgar Anton Häring became, like all foreign missionaries, had to leave China after the Chinese Communist Party came to power.

Edgar Anton Häring died in Ingolstadt, Bavaria, West Germany, at the age of 77.

References

1894 births
1971 deaths
People from Tuttlingen (district)
Chinese Roman Catholic bishops
German Roman Catholic bishops